Daniel Webster was a 19th-century American politician who served as Secretary of State.
 Statue of Daniel Webster (New York City), an outdoor bronze sculpture by Thomas Ball
 Fictional portrait by Stephen Vincent Benét in The Devil and Daniel Webster (1936)
Daniel Webster Highway, New Hampshire
 see also List of things named for Daniel Webster

Daniel or Dan Webster may also refer to:
 Daniel Webster Whittle (1840–1901), the author of a number of popular Christians hymns
 Daniel Webster Gill (1856–1933), Wyoming state senator
 Dan Webster (baseball) (1912–1988), American baseball player
 Daniel Webster (1932–2018), chief music critic of The Philadelphia Inquirer, 1963-1999
 Daniel Webster (Florida politician) (born 1949), U.S. Representative for Florida's 11th District
 Daniel Webster (academic) (born 1960), director of the Center for Gun Policy and Research at Johns Hopkins University
 Daniel K. Webster (born 1964), former member of the Massachusetts House of Representatives

Webster, Daniel